Founded in 1935, the International Association for Hydro-Environment Engineering and Research (IAHR) is a worldwide, not-for-profit, global, independent members-based organisation of engineers, professionals and researchers working in fields related to the hydro-environment and in particular with reference to hydraulics and its practical application. IAHR was called the International Association of Hydraulic Engineering and Research until 2009.

IAHR stimulates and promotes both research and its application, and by doing so contributes to sustainable development, a holistic approach to water resources management, the protection of the environment, and a better water future for all.

Activities range from river and maritime hydraulics to water resources development, flood risk management and ecohydraulics, through to ice engineering, hydroinformatics and continuing education and training. IAHR stimulates and promotes both research and its application, and by so doing strives to contribute to sustainable development, the optimisation of world water resources management and industrial flow processes. 

IAHR accomplishes its goals by a wide variety of member activities, including international networking, events, publications and advocacy and international co-operation.

The activities of IAHR are carried out by two full-time professional secretariats with offices in Madrid, Spain, which is hosted by the consortium Spain Water (CEDEX, Dirección General del Agua, Dirección General de la Costa y el Mar, Spain), and in Beijing, China, hosted by IWHR.

The governing body of the association is a council elected by member ballot every two years. The current president is Prof. Joseph Hun-wei Lee (Hong Kong, China). The current vice-presidents are:  Prof. Amparo López Jiménez (Spain), Dr. Robert Ettema (United States of America), and Prof Hyoseop Woo (Republic of Korea). Dr. Ramon Gutierrez-Serret and Dr Jing Peng are Secretary Generals.

IAHR is a Scientific Associate of the International Council for Science (ICSU) and is a partner organisation of UN-Water.

International networking platform 
IAHR provides a world class international networking platform. It engages today’s experts and helps prepare the next generation to respond to the complexities of future challenges. 

Technical Committees and Working Groups exchange and work on the latest hydro-environment knowledge and innovations, collaborate on emerging and pressing water and environmental engineering issues, and influence research agendas.

Institute members belong to a vibrant and global community of organisations, authorities, laboratories, companies, and educational institutions involved in hydro-environment engineering, research, water resources management, practice and application.

Young Professionals Networks ensure that new generations of future hydro-environment professionals and researchers have the opportunity to engage, network, and connect with peers and senior members, receive mentoring and support, and get access to the latest knowledge, information and know-how in the early stage of their careers.

Regional Divisions consider regional hydro-environment concerns and priorities and ensure the regional relevance and impact of the association’s activities.

Events 
IAHR convenes events that set agendas and mobilise collective knowledge of the hydro-environment community. The association convenes congresses, symposiums, seminars, workshops and meetings, providing learning experiences around the world focused on the most pertinent and emerging topics. 

Held every two years, IAHR World Congresses are one of the most important activities of the association and attract participants from all over the world. The Congresses provide scientists, engineers, organisations, authorities, companies, and early career professionals with a stimulating opportunity to meet, share and discuss recent advances and experiences, identify innovative and emerging trends in hydro-environmental science and engineering, and get inspired. The forthcoming 40th IAHR World Congress, under the overall theme Rivers - Connecting Mountains and Coasts, will take place in Vienna, Austria, from 21 to 25 August 2023.

IAHR Regional Congresses address regional hydro-environment concerns and priorities. 

IAHR International Symposiums provide a premier interdisciplinary venue for best-in-class researchers, engineers, and practitioners to present and discuss latest research, developments, and applications in their areas of expertise. International symposiums are a reference in their field and technical communities.

IAHR Young Professionals Congresses give young professionals, researchers, and students the opportunity to network, present and promote their work, and access mentoring from leading global experts.

IAHR Webinars provide an online platform where leading experts and professionals can share, discuss, and debate the latest development on a range of hydro-environmente topics and challenges. They are a vanguard for quickly and easily bringing access to topics of importance to broad audiences around the world.

Publications 
IAHR Publications inspire, disseminate and catalyse state-of-the-art knowledge and thinking. IAHR publishes and amplifies research excellence and best practice knowledge on hydro-environment science and engineering to achieve a sustainable water future.

Journals provide thought leadership and a platform to report on new research and exchange technical and professional knowledge on the hydro-environment. Publishing in IAHR journals provides citable, peerreviewed credit to authors.

IAHR publishes several international scientific journals in collaboration with Taylor & Francis and Elsevier – the Journal of Hydraulic Research, the International Journal of River Basin Management, the Journal of Applied Water Engineering and Research, the Revista Iberoamericana del Agua RIBAGUA jointly with the World Council of Civil Engineers (WCCE), the Journal of Ecohydraulics, the Journal of Hydro-Environment Engineering and Research with the Korean Water Resources Association, and the Latin American Water Journal of Young Researchers and Professionals.

Proceedings from conferences and events contribute valuable insights to hydro-environment research.

Hydrolink  quarterly magazine brings the latest on hydro-environment research application to practice. Now freely accessible to all!

White Paper Series catalyses thinking, inspires debate, facilitates the application of scientific knowledge, and exposes complex and emerging issues in hydro-environment and engineering research.

Book and Water Monograph Series introduces readers to cutting-edge approaches to facilitate understanding of critical and technical issues.

Advocacy 
IAHR is an organisation of international experts working with strategic partners for global outreach and advocacy on matters of interest and importance to its members. It acts as a global voice on behalf of the hydro-environment industry and research community.

IAHR Awards recognise the careers, papers, and projects of outstanding individuals and institutions who have had a remarkable impact on hydro-environment engineering and research.

Collaborations and partnerships support the international agenda on matters of global concern such as the Sustainable Development Goals, climate change, science policy, green development and flood management, and ensure IAHR's voice and expertise has an impact through strategic alliances with key partners like UN-Water, UNESCO, WMO, IDNDR, GWP, ICSU, etc.

References

 IAHR publishes the Journal of Hydraulic Research in partnership with Taylor & Francis.
 

 IAHR publishes the International Journal of River Basin Management together with the International Association of Hydrological Sciences and INBO and in partnership with Taylor & Francis.
 

 IAHR publishes the International Journal of Applied Water Engineering and Research together with the World Council of Civil Engineers and in partnership with Taylor & Francis.
 

 The IAHR Asia Pacific Division publishes the Journal of Hydro-Environment Research in collaboration with the KWRA, Korea Water Resources Association and Elsevier
 

 The IAHR Latin America Division publishes the Revista Iberoamericana del Agua in collaboration with the World Council of Civil Engineers (WCCE).
 

Hydraulic engineering organizations
Members of the International Council for Science
Organizations established in 1935
Engineering societies
International organisations based in Spain
International scientific organizations
1935 establishments in the Netherlands
Organisations based in Madrid
Members of the International Science Council